Francesco Federico Campana (15 February 1771 in Turin, Peveragno or Cuneo – 16 February 1807 in Ostrołęka) was an Italian général de brigade who served in the armies of Napoleon I of France.

Life 
Commander of Turin's National Guard, he began his career in the French revolutionary armies operating in Italy (known as the armée d'Italie) and became aide de camp to general Victor. He fought in the 1795 campaign against the Austro-Sardinians and was wounded at Loano. He became prefect of Marengo in 1803 after becoming a general, and fought in the 1805, 1806 and 1807 campaigns. He was killed in battle at Ostrołęka in 1807 and on Napoleon's orders his name was engraved on the bronze tablets at the château de Versailles.

1771 births
1807 deaths
French commanders of the Napoleonic Wars
French military personnel killed in the Napoleonic Wars
French military personnel of the French Revolutionary Wars
Military personnel from Turin
Names inscribed under the Arc de Triomphe